Psychonomics describes an approach to psychology that aims at discovering the laws (Greek: 'nomos') that govern the workings of the mind (Greek: 'psyche'). The field is directly related to experimental psychology.  The word is used most prominently by the Psychonomic Society, a society of experimental psychologists in the United States and around the world.

While the aims of psychonomics are, to some extent, similar to those of metaphysics its methods differ insofar as it takes a practical rather than theoretical approach.

External links
http://www.psychonomic.org/

Experimental psychology